Raga shree may refer to:

 Shree (Hindustani raga)
 Shree (Carnatic raga)